Tonni or Tónni is a given name and a surname. 

 Tania Rahman Tonni, Bangladeshi model
 Tonni Hansen (born 1958), Danish politician

See also

Toni
Tonin (name)
Tonna (disambiguation)
Tonne (name)
Tonni (disambiguation)
Tonnie
Tonnis
Tonny (name)
Tonti (disambiguation)

Notes